The 1967–68 Primeira Divisão was the 34th season of top-tier football in Portugal.

Overview
It was contested by 14 teams, and S.L. Benfica won the championship.

League standings

Results

References

External links
 Portugal 1967-68 - RSSSF (Jorge Miguel Teixeira)
 Portuguese League 1967/68 - footballzz.co.uk
 Portugal - Table of Honor - Soccer Library 

Primeira Liga seasons
1967–68 in Portuguese football
Portugal